Predisposition may refer to:

 Genetic predisposition, a genetic effect which can identify individuals who may be predisposed to certain health problems
 Predispositioning theory, mathematical term in the field of decision theory
 Calculus of predispositions, method of calculating probability
 Instinct, a biological predisposition, an innate and biologically vectored behavior that can be easily learned
 Predisposition (law), a legal concept related to entrapment
 Predisposition (psychology), related to the term genetic predisposition